Warsaw I is a Polish parliamentary constituency in the Masovian Voivodeship.  It elects twenty members of the Sejm.

The district has the number '19' for elections to the Sejm, and is named after the country's capital city, Warsaw.  It covers the city county of Warsaw.

Results 1991-2019

|- class="unsortable"
!rowspan=2 colspan=2|Parties!!%!!S!!%!!S!!%!!S!!%!!S!!%!!S!!%!!S!!%!!S!!%!!S!!%!!S
|- class="unsortable" align="center"
! colspan=2| 1991
! colspan=2| 1993
! colspan=2| 1997
! colspan=2| 2001
! colspan=2| 2005
! colspan=2| 2007
! colspan=2| 2011
! colspan=2| 2015
! colspan=2| 2019
|-
| bgcolor=orange| || align="left"| UD || style="background:orange;"|18.9 || style="background:orange;"|3 || 18.5 || 5 || colspan=14| 
|-
| || align="left"| KLD || 16.6 || 3 || 8.0 ||  || colspan=14| 
|-
| || align="left"| POC || 14.3 || 3 || colspan=16| 
|-
| bgcolor=#CE000C| || align="left"| SLD || 13.3 || 2 || style="background:#CE000C;"|22.4 || style="background:#CE000C;"|7 || 25.9 || 5 || style="background:#CE000C;"|36.8 || style="background:#CE000C;"|8 || 11.5 || 3 || align=center colspan=2| In LiD || 7.7 || 1 || 8.6 ||  || align=center colspan=2| In Lewica
|-
| bgcolor=black| || align="left"| WAK || 6.7 || 1 || colspan=16| 
|-
| bgcolor=#CC0033| || align="left"| SP || 4.9 || 1 || colspan=16| 
|-
| bgcolor=black| || align="left"| KPN || 4.4 || 1 || 3.5 || 1 || colspan=14| 
|-
| bgcolor=#FFBF00| || align="left"| PPPP || 3.9 || 1 || colspan=16| 
|-
| bgcolor=#959EAF| || align="left"| UPR || 2.4 || 1 || colspan=16| 
|-
| bgcolor=#CC0033| || align="left"| RDS || 1.8 || 1 || colspan=16| 
|-
| bgcolor=| || align="left"| PSL || 1.7 ||  || 2.8 ||  || 0.9 ||  || 1.6 ||  || 0.9 ||  || 2.3 ||  || 1.7 ||  || 0.7 ||  || 4.8 || 1
|-
| bgcolor=red| || align="left"| UP || colspan=2| || 11.9 || 3 || 5.0 ||  || align=center colspan=2| In SLD || 6.5 ||  || align=center colspan=2| In LiD || colspan=6| 
|-
| bgcolor=#A9A9A9| || align="left"| BBWR || colspan=2| || 6.4 || 1 || colspan=14| 
|-
| bgcolor=white| || align="left"| AWS || colspan=4| || style="background:white;"|31.9 || style="background:white;"|6 || 4.0 ||  || colspan=10| 
|-
| bgcolor=blue| || align="left"| UW || colspan=4| || 21.7 || 4 || 6.7 ||  || colspan=10| 
|-
| bgcolor=red| || align="left"| ROP || colspan=4| || 9.2 || 2 || colspan=12| 
|-
| bgcolor=| || align="left"| PiS || colspan=6| || 21.6 || 5 || 29.9 || 7 || 27.7 || 6 || 27.3 || 6 || style="background:;"|29.9 || style="background:;"|8 || 27.5 || 6
|-
| bgcolor=| || align="left"| PO || colspan=6| || 18.9 || 4 || style="background:;"|33.1 || style="background:;"|8 || style="background:;"|54.0 || style="background:;"|11 || style="background:;"|49.0 || style="background:;"|11 || 27.5 || 7 || style="background:;"|42.1 || style="background:;"|9
|-
| bgcolor=#CEE3EE| || align="left"| LPR || colspan=6| || 7.1 || 2 || 5.9 || 1 || 1.2 ||  || colspan=6| 
|-
| bgcolor=#FF4500| || align="left"| LiD || colspan=10| || 12.7 || 2 || colspan=6| 
|-
| bgcolor=| || align="left"| RP || colspan=12| || 12.7 || 2 || colspan=4| 
|-
| bgcolor=| || align="left"| Modern || colspan=14| || 13.4 || 3 || colspan=2| 
|-
| bgcolor=black| || align="left"| Kukiz'15 || colspan=14| || 7.8 || 2 || colspan=2| 
|-
| bgcolor=#AC145A| || align="left"| Lewica || colspan=16| || 18.2 || 3
|-
| bgcolor=| || align="left"| KWiN || colspan=16| || 7.5 || 1
|-
! colspan=2| Seats || colspan=6|17 || colspan=6| 19 || colspan=6| 20
|}

List of members

2019-2023

Footnotes

Electoral districts of Poland
Politics of Warsaw